Chris Opperman (born November 20, 1978) is a composer who has recently emerged into the mainstream.  Opperman is known mostly for his work orchestrating the music of guitarists Steve Vai and Mike Keneally for their respective performances with Holland's Metropole Orkest.  Opperman also performed on Steve Vai's first round of orchestral concerts and the song "Lotus Feet" was nominated for the 2006 Grammy Award for Best Rock Instrumental Performance. Also, "The Attitude Song" from Vai's Sound Theories Vol. I & II album was nominated for the 2008 Grammy Award for Best Rock Instrumental Performance.

Raised in Clifton, New Jersey, Opperman graduated in 1996 from Clifton High School where he participated in the school's marching band on the coronet.

However, Opperman has several albums of his own music which is essentially a cross between 1990s alternative rock and his favorite 20th-century composers (Schoenberg, Stravinsky, Webern, and Zappa).  His main instrument is the piano.  However, he has also been known to play the trumpet and the guitar on occasion, and will rarely sing.   Opperman lived in Los Angeles, California, from 2000 to 2008, when he moved back to New Jersey, where he earned a master's degree in music theory/composition from Montclair State University in May 2010. Opperman now works as an adjunct professor at Montclair State University and the Mason Gross School of the Arts at Rutgers University, where he is earning his Ph.D. in music composition.

In 2019, Opperman ran a successful Kickstarter campaign for his sixth album Chamber Music from Hell. The album was produced by longtime bass player for Dweezil Zappa, Kurt Morgan. It is a contemporary classical concept album about a posthuman civilization and the music that follows. One of the pieces, "Are We Living in a Computer Simulation?" was inspired by the paper by philosopher Nick Bostrom and was featured in Prog Magazine UK.

In 2020, Opperman collaborated with composer/conductor Eric Roth and the Fifth House Ensemble on a tour and album of chamber music from the videogame Undertale by Toby Fox called Undertale LIVE.

Discography

Solo albums 
 Oppy Music, Vol. I: Purple, Crayon (1998)
 Klavierstucke (2001)
 Concepts of Non-linear Time (2004)
 Beyond the Foggy Highway (2005)
 The Lionheart (2010)
 Aphrodite Nights - Single (2011)
 Studio House - EP (2013)
 Chamber Music from Hell (2020)

With Steve Vai 
 Real Illusions: Reflections (2005)
 Sound Theories Vol. I & II (2007)
 Playlist: The Very Best of Steve Vai (2009)
 Naked Tracks, Vol. 5 (2008)
 Naked Tracks, Vol. 6 (2013)

With Mike Keneally 
 Dancing (2000)
 Dancing with Myself (2000)
 The Universe Will Provide (2004)
 Parallel Universe (2004)
 Guitar Therapy Live (2006)
 Wine and Pickles (2008)

Album Reviews
[ Klavierstücke]
[ Concepts of Non-Linear Time]
[ Beyond the Foggy Highway]

References

  Westergaard, Sean [ Chris Opperman at AllMusic.com] 
  Cowen, Richard The Record, May 22nd, 2010

American male composers
21st-century American composers
1978 births
Living people
Montclair State University alumni
Montclair State University faculty
21st-century American male musicians
Clifton High School (New Jersey) alumni
Musicians from New Jersey
People from Clifton, New Jersey
Rutgers University faculty